Tuzandeh Jan-e Kohneh (also Romanized as Tūzandeh Jān-e Kohneh; also known as Tūzand Jān) is a village in Taghenkoh-e Shomali Rural District, Taghenkoh District, Firuzeh County, Razavi Khorasan Province, Iran. At the 2006 census, its population was 277, in 76 families.

References 

Populated places in Firuzeh County